Anna Nicholas (born 1961, Rochester, Kent) is a British travel writer and author based in Majorca, Spain.

Nicholas spent most of her childhood in London before studying Classics and English Literature at Leeds University in 1980. She worked for the charity Help the Aged, handling event PR for Princess Diana, before working for the Guinness Book of Records as an invigilator and communications director. Following a period judging bizarre world records, Nicholas started her own luxury and travel public relations agency, ANA Communications.

She also became a freelance travel writer, writing for publications including the Financial Times, The Independent, Tatler, Daily Express and Evening Standard. She was invited by the explorer Colonel John Blashford-Snell to join his charity, The Scientific Exploration Society, as a director and trustee and thus began a long period of making tough global expeditions to remote locations. Nicholas featured in a BBC TV documentary when she was on the team of an expedition to carry a grand piano to the remote Wai-Wai tribe in South America. She relocated with her family to Majorca in the Balearic Islands in 2005 where she continued to run her PR business in London before eventually settling down to become a full-time writer.

Nicholas is a keen marathon runner, raising money for charities including orphanages in Colombo and Kandy in Sri Lanka.

Books by Anna Nicholas
A Lizard in my Luggage, Summersdale, 2007. Focuses on Nicholas' experiences adapting to life in rural Majorca.
Cat on a Hot Tiled Roof, Summersdale, 2008. Sequel to A Lizard in my Luggage.
Goats from a Small Island, Summersdale, 2009. Focuses on Myotragus, the mouse-goat, now extinct, which roamed Majorca and Menorca up until 5000 years ago. 2009 marks the centenary of its discovery by British scientist, Dorothea Bate in 1909.
Donkeys on my Doorstep, Summersdale 2010. Fourth in the series on moving to and living in Majorca.
Strictly Off the Record, Summersdale, 2010. Memoirs of judging record attempts with Guinness World Records founder, Norris McWhirter.

References

External links
Anna Nicholas' official website
Author's Page on Summersdale
Author's Page on Amazon.co.uk

1961 births
English travel writers
British women travel writers
Living people